John Carrick (14 June 1914 – 4 January 1978) was a botanist and the author of a number of plant names. He was born in Glasgow and died in Australia. He worked at the University of Malaya from 1952 to 1967 and then became a botanist at the South Australian State Herbarium.

The mintbush, Prostanthera carrickiana was named in his honour.

References

1914 births
1978 deaths
British botanists
Australian Botanical Liaison Officers
British expatriates in Malaysia
British emigrants to Australia